Raffaella Reggi was the defending champion but did not compete that year.

Stephanie Rehe won in the final 6–1, 6–1 against Ann Grossman.

Seeds
A champion seed is indicated in bold text while text in italics indicates the round in which that seed was eliminated.

  Patty Fendick (first round)
  Stephanie Rehe (champion)
  Elly Hakami (second round)
  Rosalyn Fairbank (semifinals)
  Robin White (second round)
  Gretchen Magers (quarterfinals)
  Sara Gomer (first round)
  Jo Durie (quarterfinals)

Draw

External links
 1988 Virginia Slims of San Diego draw

Southern California Open
1988 WTA Tour